The Tree of Knowledge is a novel written by Pío Baroja. It was published in 1911, although the action takes place between 1887 and 1898. It is a semi-autobiographical work divided into two symmetrical parts (I-III and V–VII) separated by a long philosophical conversation between the protagonist and his uncle, Doctor Iturrioz (IV).

Plot summary
The first part of the novel deals with the life of the medicine student Andrés Hurtado. Through his family, teachers, classmates and diverse friends, Baroja draws a merciless painting of the bourgeois and proletarian 19th century inhabitants of Madrid.

The second half of the novel tells the stay of Hurtado (now a doctor) in Alcolea, a fictitious town in Castilla-La Mancha (where the author shows the dreadful conditions the peasant had to endure such as caciquism, ignorance, apathy or resignation), his return to Madrid (where he works as a hygiene doctor – emphasizing the description that Baroja makes of prostitution in the 19th century Madrid) and, finally, his unfortunate marriage to Lulú, a young woman he met when he was a student.

IV is in direct dialogue (it is totally different from the rest of the novel in which third-person narration is predominant) and contrasts the English pragmatism (supported by Doctor Iturrioz) to the German idealism that Andrés Hurtado defends.

1911 novels
Spanish autobiographical novels
Novels set in Spain
Fiction set in the 1890s